The 2016–17 Iranian Futsal 1st Division will be divided into two phases.

The league is composed of 18 teams divided into two divisions of 9 teams each, whose teams are divided geographically. Teams will play only other teams in their own division, once at home and once away for a total of 16 matches each.

Teams

Group A

Group B 

1 Paj Mashhad Renamed to Danesh Va Varzesh Fariman
Note: Persepolis Behzisti and Bank Resalat Kerman Withdrew from the league before the start of competition.

Number of teams by region

League standings

Group A

Group B

Results table

Group A

Group B

Clubs season-progress

Play off

Standings

Results table

Clubs season-progress

See also 
 2016–17 Futsal Super League
 2017 Futsal's 2nd Division
 2016–17 Iran Pro League
 2016–17 Azadegan League
 2016–17 Iran Football's 2nd Division
 2016–17 Iran Football's 3rd Division
 2016–17 Hazfi Cup
 Iranian Super Cup

References

External links 
   فوتسال نیوز 
  I.R. Iran Football Federation

Iran Futsal's 1st Division seasons
2016–17 in Iranian futsal leagues